Commesso, also referred to as Florentine mosaic, is a method of piecing together cut sections of luminous, narrow gemstones to form works of art. Precise patterns are cut into a slab of (generally black) marble. Gems are then cautiously cut and meticulously inlaid  into these patterns. The work is then polished section by section, as it cannot be polished as a whole due to gems having different hardnesses. The practice, which began in Florence, Italy, dates back to at least the 14th century and gained  prominence just before the 17th century. Some of its uses include making pictures and decorating furniture and architecture.

Image gallery

See also 

Mosaic
Florentine painting
Opificio delle pietre dure

References 

Mosaic
Italian art
16th century in art